Haji Mohammed Allarakha Shivji (13 December 1878 – 21 January 1921), also spelled Hajji Mohammad Alarakhiya, was a Gujarati literary journalist and author.

Biography
Haji Mohammed Allarakha Shivji was born on 13 December 1878 in Bombay to a Khoja Ismaili businessman. He was a native of Kutch. He studied Gujarati initially at home, and later studied up to the sixth grade at Fort Highschool in Bombay. After 1895, he studied Hindi, English and Marathi. To bring magazine like The Strand Magazine in Gujarati, he founded Visami Sadi (The Twentieth Century), a pictorial periodical in 1914 and published it from 1916 to 1920. He sold three family mansions and invested around Rs 15 million for the magazine. It became popular but he never recovered any money from it. He was a connoisseur of art. He died in an accident in Bombay on 21 January 1921.

Works

Allarakha is best known for his periodical Visami Sadi. He wrote and translated several works under pen name, Salim. Mogal Rang Mahel and Shish Mahel are his stories. Meharunnisa athwa Shahenshah Jahangir ane Noorjahan no Prem (1904) is his play with Urdu shayaris. Rashida (1908) is his novel.

Suchet Singh established Oriental Film Manufacturing Company of Bombay with help of Allarakha in 1919.

See also
 List of Gujarati-language writers

References

External links
 Restored and digital archive of Visami Sadi 

1878 births
1921 deaths
Indian Ismailis
Gujarati-language writers
20th-century Indian journalists
Writers from Mumbai
Indian editors
Indian publishers (people)
20th-century Indian dramatists and playwrights
Journalists from Maharashtra
People from Kutch district